Julian Taylor is a Canadian singer-songwriter. Formerly associated with the band Staggered Crossing, he has continued to record and perform as the leader of the eponymous Julian Taylor Band since Staggered Crossing's breakup in 2007.

His songs have appeared in television series including Degrassi: The Next Generation, Elementary and Haven.

He is of mixed Black Canadian and Mohawk descent.

Discography

Zero to Eleven - 2013
Tech Noir - 2014
Desert Star, Vol. 1 - 2015
Hey Hey Two Two - 2015
Avalanche - 2019
The Ridge - 2020
Beyond the Reservoir - 2022

Awards and nominations

References

External links

21st-century Black Canadian male singers
Afro-Indigenous people
Canadian rock singers
Canadian male singer-songwriters
First Nations musicians
Canadian Mohawk people
Musicians from Toronto
Living people
Year of birth missing (living people)
Canadian Folk Music Award winners
20th-century Black Canadian male singers